2 Samuel 8 is the eighth chapter of the Second Book of Samuel in the Old Testament of the Christian Bible or the second part of Books of Samuel in the Hebrew Bible. According to Jewish tradition the book was attributed to the prophet Samuel, with additions by the prophets Gad and Nathan, but modern scholars view it as a composition of a number of independent texts of various ages from c. 630–540 BCE. This chapter contains the account of David's reign in Jerusalem. This is within a section comprising 2 Samuel 2–8 which deals with the period when David set up his kingdom.

Text
This chapter was originally written in the Hebrew language. It is divided into 18 verses.

Textual witnesses

Some early manuscripts containing the text of this chapter in Hebrew are of the Masoretic Text tradition, which includes the Codex Cairensis (895), Aleppo Codex (10th century), and Codex Leningradensis (1008). Fragments containing parts of this chapter in Hebrew were found among the Dead Sea Scrolls including 4Q51 (4QSam; 100–50 BCE) with extant verses 1–8.

Extant ancient manuscripts of a translation into Koine Greek known as the Septuagint (originally was made in the last few centuries BCE) include Codex Vaticanus (B; B; 4th century) and Codex Alexandrinus (A; A; 5th century).

Old Testament references
: ; 
:

Places 

Aram
Berothah
Betah
Damascus
Edom
Euphrates
Hama
Jerusalem
Metheg-ammah
Moab
Syria
Valley of Salt
Zobah

Analysis
This chapter contains a catalogue of David's victories (verses 1–14), arranged thematically rather than chronologically, and a list of David's court officials (verses 15–18).

David's victories (8:1–14)
This section can be divided into two sections: David's victories (verses 2–6) and David's handling of the plunder (verses 7–14), with the first verse serving as an overture to introduce the
two verbs that guide the reading: David “strikes” ('n-k-h') his enemies and then "takes" ('l-q-kh') plunder.  Three interlocking pairs of
refrains integrate the whole unit, which main theme is the ascent of David as a shepherd-king to the world stage, just as God promised to give David a great name ("the LORD gave victory to David wherever he went"; cf. 2 Samuel 7:9).

The structure of this section is as follows:
1. David's victories (8:1-6)
David strikes (n-k-h) the Philistines (8:1)
David strikes (n-k-h) the Moabites (8:2ab)
Refrain 1: The Moabites became servants to David, bearers of tribute (8:2c)
David strikes (n-k-h) Hadadezer (8:3–4)
David strikes (n-k-h) the Arameans (8:5)
Refrain 2: David establishes garrisons in foreign territory (8:6a)
Refrain 1: The Arameans became servants to David, bearers of tribute (8:6b)
Refrain 3: The Lord gave victory to David wherever he went (8:6c)

2. David and the plunder (8:7–14)
David takes (l-q-kh) gold from Hadadezer's servants and takes (l-q-kh) bronze from Hadadezer's town (8:7–8)
David receives tribute from King Toi (8:9–10)
David dedicates all the plunder to the Lord (8:11–12)
David defeats the Edomites (8:13)
Refrain 2: David establishes garrisons in foreign territory (8:14a)
Refrain 3: The Lord gave victory to David wherever he went (8:14b)

These verses, together with other passages (cf. 1 Samuel 30:1–31; 2 Samuel 5:17–25; 10:1–11:1; 12:26–31; 21:15–22) provide a list of David's victories, as shown below: 

According to 2 Samuel 10:1–19 and this passage, David fought three successive battles against the Arameans. king Toi (or "Tou") of Hamath (which was on the Orontes River to the north of Zobah) heard about David's successes and sent his son to make an alliance with David, bringing expensive gifts. As a result of his conquests David took control over what is now 'Palestine' from the Philistines, with garrisons placed in Moab, Edom, and Ammon (which corresponds to modern Jordan), and also conquered Aramean states (corresponding to modern Syria and eastern Lebanon).

Verse 1
After this David defeated the Philistines and subdued them, and David took Metheg-ammah out of the hand of the Philistines.
"After this": from Hebrew "wayehî ’a-ḥă-rê-ḵên", "and-happened after this", indicating an unspecified interval of time since God's promise to David in the previous chapter.
"Metheg-ammah": from Hebrew: "metheg ha-ammah", literally, "the Bridle of the Mother City", because in 2 Samuel 20:19 "ammah" refers to a "mother city" also can be rendered as "the bridle of one cubit." or "the forearm bridle". The parallel text in 1 Chronicles 18:1 reads "Gath and its daughters (nearby villages)".

David's court officials (8:15–18)
The list of David's court officials is not exactly identical with another version in 2 Samuel 20:23–26, which indicates the existence of several variants in archives over a period of time. The comparison is as follows:

Joab had been with David and had command of the army for a long time (cf 2 Samuel 2), whereas Jehoshaphat was still in office in the time of Solomon (1 Kings 4:3). Zadok and Abiathar shared the priesthood until David's death (1 Kings 2:26). The Cherethites and Pelethites were the royal bodyguard, under the command of Benaiah (cf. 1 Chronicles 18:17); they were David's most loyal soldiers, marching with David out of Jerusalem during Absalom's rebellion (2 Samuel 15:18), helping to chase the rebellious Sheba son of Bichri (2 Samuel 20:7), and guarding Solomon's anointing by Zadok the high priest as David's successor (1 Kings 1).

See also

Related Bible parts: 2 Samuel 5, 2 Samuel 20, 1 Kings 1, 1 Chronicles 18, Psalm 60

Notes

References

Sources

Commentaries on Samuel

General

External links
 Jewish translations:
 Samuel II - II Samuel - Chapter 8 (Judaica Press). Hebrew text and English translation [with Rashi's commentary] at Chabad.org
 Christian translations:
 Online Bible at GospelHall.org (ESV, KJV, Darby, American Standard Version, Bible in Basic English)
 2 Samuel chapter 8. Bible Gateway

08